Kelly's  is a test statistic that can be used to test a genetic region for deviations from the neutral model, based on the squared correlation of allelic identity between loci.

Details 

a standardised measure of this is  the squared correlation of allelic identity between loci  and 

Where   averages   over all pairwise combinations between S loci.

Usage 
Inflated  scores indicate a deviation from the neutral model and can be used as a potential signature of previous selection

References 

Statistical hypothesis testing
Neutral theory